The 2020–21 Utah Runnin' Utes men's basketball team represented the University of Utah during the 2020–21 NCAA Division I men's basketball season. The team is led by tenth-year head coach Larry Krystkowiak. They played their home games at the Jon M. Huntsman Center in Salt Lake City, Utah as members of the Pac-12 Conference.

Previous season
The Utes finished the 2019–20 season 16–15, 7–11 in Pac-12 play to finish in a three-way tie for eighth place. They lost in the first round of the Pac-12 tournament to Oregon State.

Off-season

Departures

Incoming transfers

2020 recruiting class

2021 recruiting class

2022 recruiting class

Roster

Schedule and results 

|-
!colspan=12 style=| Regular season

|-
!colspan=12 style=| Pac-12 tournament

Source:

References

2020–21 Pac-12 Conference men's basketball season
2019-20 team
Utah Utes
Utah Utes